The 1933 24 Hours of Le Mans was the 11th Grand Prix of Endurance. It took place at the Circuit de la Sarthe on 17 and 18 June 1933. Up against five strong privateer entries from Alfa Romeo, the opposition looked fairly weak, mostly being of 1920s vintage. There was a strong British contingent in the smaller classes. The big drawcard was the presence of top European drivers Louis Chiron and Tazio Nuvolari. The current European champion was paired with one of the previous year's winners, Raymond Sommer

From the start, the Italian cars set a strong pace. Sommer broke the track-record several times building a two-minute lead over the Alfas of Chiron, Lewis, Chinetti and Moll. He had lapped the rest of the field by the end of the second hour. Chiron was delayed by an intransigent starter unit, but his co-driver Franco Cortese drove hard to bring the car back up to second going into the night. Most of the other large-engine contenders had fallen away, allowing Odette Siko in a 1.8-litre supercharged Alfa Romeo to move up to fifth. The British teams of Aston Martin, Riley and MG filled out the back end of the top-10.

A processional first half of the race was turned on its head come the dawn on Sunday when Nuvolari brought the leading Alfa in with fender damage and a leaking fuel-tank. The two-lap lead they had built up was lost in the quarter-hour needed for repairs. The Chiron and Chinetti cars then swapped the lead for the next two hours in close, exciting racing. At 7am a short rain-shower caused Odette Siko to have a serious accident on the fast approach to Indianapolis corner. The car was wrecked as it ploughed into the trees but fortunately the driver was thrown clear and only lightly injured.

Hard work by Nuvolari, who was fresh after avoiding driving during the night, had got him back in front by 9am. Soon after, Cortese crashed when a front wheel bearing collapsed. With the closest opposition gone, what could have been a simple run to the finish was anything but. When Sommer pitted the car at midday, their lead was again wiped with repairs to the radiator, brakes and worsening fuel-leak. Mechanics used chewing-gum to plug the crack. Nuvolari would then overtake the smooth-running Chinetti/Gunzberg car only to have to stop to check the fuel-tank and lose the lead again. By the time of the final stops, with an hour to go, the two cars were less than a minute apart. Going onto the last lap, the superior speed of Nuvolari's car allowed him to pass on the back straight, only to lose it again under braking at the Mulsanne corner. Then Chinetti missed a gear at Arnage and Nuvolari was through again. When Chinetti was baulked by slow traffic coming out of White House it gave Nuvolari the clear run to the flag, to win by just 400 metres.

The margin of victory for this race was estimated at being 9.5 seconds difference and remains one of the narrowest racing finishes at Le Mans – excluding the formation finishes of later years. Third, eight laps back, was the British-entered Alfa Romeo of Lewis/Rose-Richards. Fourth, after a very reliable run was the small 1.1-litre Riley of Peacock/van der Becke. Their excellent effort against the larger competition also gave them a handsome margin in winning the lucrative Index of Performance prize.

Regulations and Organisation
After the major circuit changes in the previous year, the Automobile Club de l'Ouest (ACO) continued with further improvements to the track. A yellow centre-line was painted down the Hunaudières Straight and reflective markers – forerunners of cat's eye reflectors were put on the approach to all the corners to assist during night driving.

A further addition to the facilities was from the city of Le Mans. A small chapel was built to allow spectators to attend mass on the Sunday morning.

In line with the ACO's policy to alternate fuel supplier, this year the contract was with Shell, who offered four fuel choices: its regular fuel, a premium grade, 100% benzole and a 70/30 blend of the premium with benzole. The ACO also revised the equivalence factor for supercharged engines up to x1.4 from the x1.33 set the previous year. Finally, they also updated some of the class distance-targets, particularly for the smaller engines.

Entries
The gradual economic recovery was signalled with a good initial list of 41 entries. However, a record thirteen entries were withdrawn before race-week. The ongoing struggles for the automotive industry were reflected by the fact that there were only four works teams present – a single French Tracta, as well three British Aston Martins, a Riley and a new Singer – none of which were of a pace to challenge for outright victory. So, this left the squadron of privateer Alfa Romeos as clear favourites.

From the finishers in the 1932 race there were eight cars eligible for the Biennial Cup. Three Italian Alfa Romeos squared up against two Aston Martins and a Riley from Great Britain, and a Lorraine-Dietrich and Amilcar from France.

Note: The first number is the number of entries, the second the number who started.

At the end of 1932, the new government-appointed CEO of Alfa Romeo, Ugo Gobbato, had withdrawn the works team from racing. Thus, it fell to the privateers to maintain the company's dominance and they did not disappoint: the marque was the best represented in the entry list, with 9 cars. Last year's winners, Raymond Sommer and Luigi Chinetti were the organisers for Alfa racing in France. This year they were in separate cars: Sommer ran the Mille Miglia 4-seater version, again fitted with an oversized fuel tank that would allow 27 laps between refills. He scored a coup getting the current European Champion, Tazio Nuvolari, as his co-driver. Released from Scuderia Ferrari for the event, he had won the Mille Miglia earlier in the year and also came with support from Pirelli tyres. Chinetti, meanwhile, was hired by wealthy Russian émigré Philippe de Gunzberg to prepare and co-drive his corto 8C. A keen amateur racer, de Gunzberg raced under the pseudonym of "Philippe Varent". Chinetti was offered a bonus 60000 francs if they won the race. Louis Chiron was also back, with an 8C-2300 Le Mans, with a 4-seater lungo (long) touring body. This year he had formed a new racing team with Rudolf Caracciola. But the German ace had broken his leg at Monaco early in the season and for Le Mans Chiron was joined by former works driver Franco Cortese who had finished second at the Mille Miglia.

There were three British Alfa entries, though only one arrived (Earl Howe, had cut his eye the week before at the French Grand Prix). With Talbot also withdrawing from motorsport, this year Arthur Fox entered an 8C tourer for his regular drivers Brian Lewis, Baron Essendon and Tim Rose-Richards. The other 8C was entered by wealthy Parisian banker, Pierre Louis-Dreyfus. He had crashed this car in last year's race, but it had been repaired and recently been sold to the up-and-coming star, French-Algerian Guy Moll. He was joined by his compatriot, former Amilcar driver Guy Cloitre, as his co-driver.

Two, smaller, 6-cylinder Alfa Romeos were also entered, running in the 3-litre class. Miss Odette Siko made headlines the previous year finishing fourth, and she returned with Louis Charavel as her co-driver. They again ran their 1768cc supercharged SS model, while in a slightly smaller 1742cc GS saloon version was fellow Frenchman André Rousseau.

Alfa Romeo's competition for outright honours was expected to come from Bugatti. Six cars were entered but only two arrived for scrutineering. Guy Bouriat entered one of the former works Type 50 with its big 5-litre supercharged straight-8 engine. Sadly, he was killed a month before Le Mans in the Picardy Grand Prix. So, his regular co-driver, Pierre Bussienne, was joined by another former E.H.P. works driver, Marie Desprez. The other was the first sports-car race for the new, unsupercharged 1.5-litre Type 51A. It was entered by the Polish émigré Count Stanisław Czaykowski, a regular Grand Prix racer in Bugattis and he teamed up with Jean Gaupillat, another privateer Bugatti driver.

The biggest car in the race was an unexpected entry – the Duesenberg Model J was one of the most exclusive cars in the world. In 1932 the supercharged Model SJ was unveiled. The mighty 6.9-litre straight-8 twin-cam engine was based on the very successful racing engine, and with supercharging it put out 320 bhp with a top speed of 215 kp/h (135 mph). Only 36 were built, including one sold to Prince Nicholas von Hohenzollern-Sigmaringen who was an exiled member of the Romanian royal family. He got the Parisian luxury-car dealer Joseph Cattaneo as a co-driver and to prepare the car. This included more suitable bodywork for racing. Cattaneo had twice previously been entered as the co-driver in Édouard Brisson's Stutz but each time the car was retired before he got to drive.

The other two large cars in the field were returning veterans of the 1920s. Racing journalist Roger Labric came back with the Lorraine-Dietrich he had entered two years earlier, this time driving it himself, using the Biennial Cup entry he had earned finishing in a small Caban. Meanwhile, rally specialist Jean Trévoux repaired his supercharged "Blower" Bentley that he had crashed early in the 1932 race. He was partnered by fellow French rally-driver Louis Gas.

Frenchman Jean Danne returned with his Rally NCP, but this time replaced the 1.4-litre Salmson normally-aspirated engine with a supercharged 1.3-litre version. The equivalence factor put him in the 2-litre class whose sole other entry was the SARA SP7 Spéciale. That privateer effort took the 1927 SP7 model and gave it modified bodywork and a slightly bigger 1.8-litre engine. The team also got former SARA-team regulars Gaston Mottet and André Marandet as their drivers.

The supercharging equivalence and a 1.0-litre lower limit meant the 1.5-litre class was a crowded affair. Aston Martin had been bought out by shipping millionaire Sir Arthur Sutherland, giving it financial security. The works team arrived with three cars including a pair of the two-door 'Le Mans' variant to contest the Biennial Cup. Technical Director and designer "Bert" Bertelli ran with former Le Mans winner and "Autocar" journalist Sammy Davis, while the other car had team regulars Pat Driscoll and Clifton Penn-Hughes. The 4-seater International that had won its class, finishing fifth the previous year, had been sold to "Mort" Morris-Goodall, who ran it as a works car with Elsie "Bill" Wisdom.

The English manufacturer Riley made its first appearance at le Mans this year. It had already achieved considerable success in the British endurance handicap races with the Riley Nine "Brooklands" roadster. The advanced 1.1-litre twin-cam engine put out 50 bhp. Three cars were prepared for Le Mans though only two arrived. The first was a works entry driven by Ken Peacock and "Bill" van der Becke, while Le Mans regular Jean Sébilleau had a French privateer entry.

For the third time, Just-Émile Vernet and Fernand Vallon raced together, again with their seven-year old Salmson GSS. As they were going to be running in the 1.5-litre class they decided to put a supercharger on the 1.1-litre engine. Two weeks earlier, in the Bol d'Or 24-hour race, they had brought the car home in second - giving them confidence to take on the Astons. Conversely, the unsupercharged 1.1-litre BNC 527 of the Alin brothers was going to have a much harder time keeping up.

After the disbursement of the Amilcar racing stable the previous year, their Parisian distributor, Clément-Auguste Martin bought the remaining MCO models from José Scaron for his Équipe de l'Ours team. Along with Amilcar engineering director (and racer) Maurice Mestivier, he set about updating them for further racing. Jean de Gavardie had won the Bol d'Or a fortnight previous when the team had entered seven cars. Three variants were presented for Le Mans. De Gavardie and his brother had his successful 1094cc 6-cylinder car, while Buquet/Clouet ran a 1074cc 4-clyinder one. Martin himself ran his with a modified Amilcar 990cc sidevalve 4-cylinder engine in the 1-litre class.

Of the four MGs entered, two arrived at scrutineering. John Ludovic Ford raced a supercharged C-type Midget. When Norman Black's entry was cancelled, Gordon Hendy used it to bring one of the new J-series cars. This J3, with its supercharged 746cc engine, had recently set a 24-hour distance record for its class at Montlhéry. Both owners paid the expenses of works mechanics to attend and assist in the race. Their competition would come from a works Tracta, making a rare racing appearance, and the small Amilcar.

Another British firm debuting at Le Mans was Singer. Like many, it was originally a bicycle manufacturer but had been building cars since the turn of the century. By the end of the 1920s it was Great Britain's third largest car company. The Singer Nine was introduced in 1932, and in October came a Sports version: a 4-seater convertible with a twin-carburettor 972cc engine uprated to produce 31 bhp. The car was soon popular in rallies and British racing events. Stanley Barnes, running the racing department for the company, bought one to Le Mans with a view to run the 24 hours to qualify for the Biennial Cup. He raced it personally, with the team's lead driver Alf Langley.

The smallest car in the field was an Austin 7 hybrid. The basic car was the mainstay of the Austin Motor Company with nearly 300,000 having been built already. One had previously been raced at Le Mans by Eric Gordon England in the 1925 race. The car that was entered started off as a works sporting prototype in 1929. Bought by Charles Metchim a year later, he often raced it in Britain, and he resolved to have the first car in the 750cc class to complete the Le Mans race. Prepared by the works garage it was given the latest race-tuned engine.

Practice and Pre-Race
In practice the night before the race, the Bentley developed clutch problems. However, Jean Chassagne, the Le Mans veteran with Bentley, Aries and Sunbeam, was on-hand and able to help get the car repaired and ready to take the start.

There would be added interest in the relative performance of tyres. Most cars were running on Dunlops, while Nuvolari bought Italian Pirellis for Sommer's Alfa, and Chiron's Alfa and Danne's Rally ran on Belgian Engleberts.

Race

Start

On a fine Saturday, 50 000 people flocked to the circuit. The honorary starter this year was Col Lindsey Lloyd, vice-president of the British Auto Club, and at the flagfall the quickest car away was the Alfa Romeo of Brian Lewis. He was soon overhauled and at the end of the first lap, it was the Alfas of Sommer, Chiron, Chinetti, Lewis and Moll followed by the Duesenberg, Bugatti and Bentley. By the end of the second lap, Sommer was lapping the little Austin. He continued to push hard, breaking "Nando" Minoia's lap record nine times by the end of the first hour. Chiron was two minutes behind, with a gap back to Lewis, Chinetti and Moll. Further back were Tarante (Bugatti), Trévoux (Bentley), Prince Nicholas (Duesenberg), Mme Siko in the smaller Alfa, and Driscoll rounding out the top-10 in the first of the Astons.

By the end of the second hour, Sommer had lapped all the cars up to the other three Alfas. Most cars pitted after the requisite minimum of 24 laps but Sommer pitted after about 2½ hours and 27 laps, handing over to crowd-favourite Nuvolari. Chiron's pitstop was delayed by a jammed starter motor so at 7pm Nuvolari held a 4-minute lead over the nearest competition. The co-drivers had taken over and Gunzberg was second ahead of Rose-Richards, Cloitre, Cattaneo (finally getting a drive) in the Duesenberg, and Cortese rushing to make up his lost time. On his out-lap after taking over the Bentley, Louis Gas misjudged his braking at the Mulsanne corner and ploughed straight through the fencing hitting a tree. Bleeding from smacking his head on the steering wheel in the impact, he limped back to the pits, but the front axle was too bent to continue.

At the third hour Nuvolari had done 31 laps and extended his lead to Gunzberg. Relishing his chance for a drive, Cattaneo had pulled the Duesenberg up to fifth. Cortese was sixth, making up the time from the pit delay. Penn-Hughes had taken over the leading Aston Martin, still running tenth, while van der Becke had the small Riley in eleventh.
Positions remained fairly static for the last hours of daylight, although Cortese had charged his way back up to fourth.

Night
Just as night was falling the elegant Duesenberg was disqualified, belatedly and much to the crowd's displeasure, for coming in for its first fuel-stop one lap too early. This moved the big Bugatti of Bussienne/Desprez up to fifth. The other Bugatti was not so fortunate, having to retire when its battery went flat and could not power the headlamps. Another having problems with its battery was John Ford's C-type MG. The dynamo was not recharging the battery, so to save power they drove without the lights on - until the ACO officials warned them they risked disqualification. Thereafter they only put them on coming out of the White House corner to the pit straight and tried to follow other cars whenever possible. They survived without incident – to themselves or others – until dawn and the danger had passed.

During the evening, the public address announced to the spectators that Sommer and Nuvolari had covered the first 500 km faster than Giuseppe Campari had done in the French Grand Prix the week before at Montlhéry.

Through the night, the cars had settled into a regular order: Sommer had a two-lap lead over Chiron/Cortese (who had fought back up to second) and Chinetti/Gunzberg with a further two laps back to Lewis/Rose-Richards. Guy Moll's Alfa Romeo had been running well, getting as high as fourth. But constant vibration broke the terminals on the battery, stopping his co-driver Cloitre out on the circuit. When Moll tried to take a new fuse out to the car, he was spotted by the officials and the car had to be disqualified. At 2am Sammy Davis, running well in the top-10, brought his Aston Martin into the pits with front suspension issues and an hour was spent replacing the springs. The big Bugatti, that had been running fifth, started having water pump issues and it lost a lot of time in the pits.

Nuvolari preferred not driving at night, so Sommer continued driving in the dark until just before dawn. At the halfway mark, the four Alfas were still well out in front with Sommer having done 118 laps. The smaller Siko/Charavel Alfa had moved past the stationary Bugatti into fifth with Driscoll's Aston Martin in seventh ahead of the Riley in eighth with twenty cars still on-track.

Morning
If the spectators thought the Saturday racing was routine the Sunday proved to be one of the most thrilling days of endurance motor-racing. At 4.30am, as dawn was breaking and early into his stint, Nuvolari bought the lead Alfa in with a broken fender and leaking petrol. The quarter-hour needed to fix it cost them two laps and allowed the other Alfas to overtake them. The lead was then strongly contested between the Alfas of Chiron/Cortese and Chinetti/Gunzberg, with each car taking an advantage depending on their respective pit cycles.

At 6am the Bugatti, having dropped to eighth and 14 laps in arrears, came to the pits in a cloud of steam and smoke so large it was mistakenly thought to be on fire. Just before 7am a brief shower swept the track. Odette Siko was caught out on the fast approach to Indianapolis. Going off the road she was flung out as the car ricocheted off the trees so violently that two fell onto the track, partially blocking it. The car rolled and caught fire. Landing on a policeman, she was taken to hospital under observation, with a broken wrist and minor burns.

One of the first cars coming past was the little Austin. It had been running virtually without a clutch for most of the race at the back of the field. Unable to stop, Metchim struggled through the tree-debris but doing so broke a steering link. Without a spare on board, he was forced to retire. Soon after, Roger Labric, who had been in and out of the pits with the Lorraine-Dietrich, finally parked it with irreparable clutch problems. Bertelli, running sixth, pitted his Aston Martin at 7.30  to secure his fenders that were coming adrift – a delay that cost time and a position. As the bigger cars had their issues, the Riley of Peacock/van der Becke kept running like clockwork and picking up places. Eighth at dawn became sixth by 7am and then an impressive fourth by midday.

Nuvolari was driving very fast now and passed Gunzberg around 7.30. By 8am he had reduced Cortese's lead to 3½ minutes and kept whittling it down to overtake him on the pit-straight before 9am, when the leaders had completed 185 laps. Sommer took over at the next pitstop, continuing the hard charge and breaking the lap record yet again. At 10am Cortese was somersaulted off the road just after Indianapolis because of a collapsed wheel bearing. He limped back to the pits, but the chassis was too misaligned to continue. Chiron was furious, Cortese disconsolate. The MG J-type of Gordon Hendy had started quickly, well ahead of its 100 km/h target. Then it had a misfire (cured by changing the sparkplugs) and a leak in its fuel-tank. The team resorted to chewing-gum and cardboard to plug the split. However, late in the morning it was stopped on the Hunaudières Straight with a terminal crankcase breakage.

With a two-lap lead over Chinetti/Gunzberg, things were looking positive for Sommer to get back-to-back victories. The British Alfa kept circulating regularly in third, waiting for the two in front to break.

Finish and post-race

After 197 laps, and a single stint by a weary Sommer, Nuvolari took over again at midday but time was lost to re-affix the broken fender. The hard driving had taken its toll and there was also a cracked radiator mount, a split exhaust and the brakes were fading. Anxiety was building in the pit regarding the leaking fuel-tank and he made another stop to fix it. Like the MG team the mechanics sealed it with chewing-gum.  Further stops were needed as the leak got worse and warranted more chewing gum – even Arthur Fox's mechanics joined in. These delays allowed Gunzberg to reduce the two minute gap to catch up and then take the lead. Fortunately the oversized fuel tank carried sufficient to still run the minimum 24 laps between top-ups, despite the leak. Nuvolari charged off after him and soon overtook the amateur driver. He made his final fuel-stop at 2.45pm. With forty minutes to go, both cars came in and Chinetti took over for the final stint. When Nuvolari stopped for a final repair, Chinetti took the lead with eight minutes to go.

Going onto the last lap, the cars were very close, and the lead changed three times: greater speed allowed Nuvolari to overtake on the Hunaudières straight, but better brakes allowed Chinetti to re-pass at the Mulsanne corner. Finally, under the great pressure Chinetti made the mistake, missing a gearchange at Arnage and running wide. Nuvolari took his chance and shot through. Up ahead, cars were crawling around waiting for the leaders to pass, to avoid doing another lap. The pair caught up with them coming out of White House. Seeing Nuvolari race past, François Paco in the Alfa saloon pulled out to follow him, right into the path of Chinetti. Braking hard to avoid ramming him, Chinetti was crucially baulked and that was all that Nuvolari needed to charge on to take the victory by the slimmest of margins – only 10 seconds, or barely 400 metres, after 24 hours racing.

Although Sommer had driven the bulk of the race (15 hours) it was Nuvolari who grabbed the headlines. All records were broken. With consecutive victories, Sommer won the Biennial Cup, and Chinetti still got his cash bonus.

Third, one hundred kilometres, and eight laps back were Lewis and Rose-Richards. Aside from a delay because of a broken headlamp mount during the night they had a fairly reliable run.

In a race of attrition, the little 1.1-litre Riley of Ken Peacock/Bill van der Becke came home an excellent fourth, comfortably winning the Index of Performance. Aston Martin was 5th for the third year in a row with Driscoll/Penn-Hughes going fourteen laps further than the previous year. Their delayed stablemate, of Bertelli & Davis made it to seventh. Splitting them was the small supercharged MG of Ford/Baumer that beat its target distance by 33 laps. After surviving the ordeal overnight with the dynamo and the lights the car had run very well, picking up places as others fell back. After blocking Chinetti on the last lap Paco brought the Alfa saloon home in eighth. The Tracta was ninth, finishing a distant second in class behind the MG but still beating its target distance by 30 laps and going further than any Tracta car had previously.

A fortnight later, Chinetti and Chiron got some revenge when they combined to win the Spa 24 Hours together. Sommer, this time driving his Le Mans-winning car with veteran Henri Stoffel, came in second.
It was a violent year in motorsport with a number of fatal and serious accidents. The worst was at Monza during the secondary Monza GP held on the same day as the Italian Grand Prix. It was raced as three heats before a final. During the second heat former Alfa Corse works drivers Giuseppe Campari and Baconin Borzacchini collided and crashed on the south banking, killing both. Czaykowski had won the first heat, and in the final was racing for the lead when he also crashed fatally just metres beyond the earlier accident.

This proved to be Nuvolari's only Le Mans appearance. The danger carried over into the next year. Early in the season, Nuvolari broke his leg crashing in the rain at a minor Italian race. Although he did subsequently race with his leg in plaster, he would not return to defend his victory. Guy Moll scored a sensational win at the Monaco Grand Prix but was killed at the Coppa Acerbo. Czaykowski's erstwhile co-driver, Jean Gaupillat, was also killed in 1934, in a French race.

The 1933 race was the last for two significant teams from the races in the 1920s, though both had rather subdued endings. SARA had entered all of the first eight races. Their best finish was fourth overall in 1927, but this year after a number of delays, the car missed its target distance by only 15 kilometres (2 laps). Bentley had dominated Le Mans, having won the event outright five times – half the races to date. But when Gas put his Bentley into the fence on his first racing lap after only two hours, the damage was too severe to continue, and it was the end of an era. Seventy years later, Bentley would return to Le Mans as a subsidiary of Volkswagen Group. They recorded three consecutive prototype class victories, culminating in outright victory in 2003.

Official results

Finishers
Results taken from Quentin Spurring's book, officially licensed by the ACO Class Winners are in Bold text.

Did Not Finish

Did Not Start

1933 Index of Performance

Note: A score of 1.00 means meeting the minimum distance for the car, and a higher score is exceeding the nominal target distance. Only the top-10 finishers are listed

Class Winners

Statistics
 Fastest Lap – R. Sommer, #11 Alfa Romeo 8C-2300 MM-LM – 5:31.4secs; 
 Winning Distance – 
 Winner's Average Speed –

References
Citations

Bibliography
 Clarke, R.M. - editor (1998)    Le Mans 'The Bentley & Alfa Years 1923-1939'    Cobham, Surrey: Brooklands Books  
 Clausager, Anders (1982)    Le Mans    London: Arthur Barker Ltd  
 Laban, Brian (2001)    Le Mans 24 Hours    London: Virgin Books   
 Spurring, Quentin (2017)    Le Mans 1930-39    Sherbourne, Dorset: Evro Publishing

External links
 Racing Sports Cars – Le Mans 24 Hours 1933 entries, results, technical detail. Retrieved 14 Nov 2019
 Le Mans History – entries, results incl. photos, hourly positions. Retrieved 14 Nov 2019
 World Sports Racing Prototypes – results, reserve entries & chassis numbers. Retrieved 14 Nov 2019
 24h en Piste – results, chassis numbers, driver photos & hourly positions (in French). Retrieved 14 Nov 2019
 Unique Cars & Parts – results & reserve entries. Retrieved 14 Nov 2019
 Formula 2 – Le Mans results & reserve entries. Retrieved 14 Nov 2019
 Motorsport Memorial – motor-racing deaths by year. Retrieved 14 Nov 2019
 The Golden Era of Grand Prix racing  – details of the Monza Grand Prix tragedy and the 1933 season. Retrieved 5 Dec 2019

24 Hours of Le Mans races
Le Mans
1933 in French motorsport